The Forrest L. Vosler Non-Commissioned Officer Academy (Vosler NCO Academy, Vosler NCOA, or NCOA) is a United States Space Force unit. Assigned to Space Training and Readiness Command's Space Delta 13, it is responsible for training newly promoted technical sergeants. It is named after Forrest L. Vosler who was an enlisted airman and a Medal of Honor awardee. It was transferred into the Space Force on 21 September 2020 and is headquartered at Peterson Space Force Base, Colorado.

List of commandants 

 CMSgt Thomas Young, ~2007
 CMSgt Gregory Stone, ~2011
 CMSgt Todd Krulick, 27 October 2014
 CMSgt Robert Woodin, 18 February 2016
 CMSgt April L. Brittain, April 2022

See also 
 Space Delta 13

References

External links 
 
 

Military education and training in the United States